This is a list of known wildfires in Arizona.

Statistics

Notable fires

Lesser known fires

References

External links

 National Interagency Fire Center
 InciWeb - Arizona Incidents
 Southwest Coordination Center
 Arizona Interagency Wildfire Prevention
 US Forest Service
 Fire Restrictions - Arizona
 Public Lands Information Center - Arizona Fire News
 Coconino NF fire history web map

Arizona
Wildfires